Chaetostoma fischeri is a species of catfish in the family Loricariidae. It is a relatively widespread freshwater fish when compared with other members of its family, as it is native to Central and South America, where it occurs in the basins of the Bayano River, the Tuira River, the San Juan River, the Guayas River, the Chagres River, the Atrato River, the Sinú River, and the Magdalena River. The species is large for a loricariid, reaching 30 cm (11.8 inches) in total length.

References 

fischeri
Fish described in 1879